Paradox Live is a Japanese media mix project created by Avex Pictures and GCREST. The project features 29 voice actors and is centered on rap battles between each faction.

Summary 
In the near future, amidst the Hip-Hop culture rises a new movement called "Phantom Live". The rappers create illusions linked to their emotions using chemically reactive accessories that contain a metal called "phantometal" with their own DNA to enthuse young people on a brilliant stage. Behind the scenes, however, they suffer from "traumatic illusions" as a side effect.

The Paradox Live's story follow four groups who are immensely popular with their respective genres. BAE, The Cat's Whisker's, cozmez and Akan Yatsura (悪漢奴等). They will lead the way to the legendary club called CLUB PARADOX where the mysterious gathering occurs. In order to prove that their own music is the number 1, they participate in battles. 

After a disaster that caused the collapse of CLUB PARADOX and prevented the final battle between the winning group and the legendary duo Buraikan (武雷管), the club has been rebuilt with a brand new competition to take place. Four new groups– VISTY, AMPRULE, 1Nm8, and Goku Luck (獄Luck)– have joined the ring alongside the current cast. With different music styles, the music groups try to fight to the top.

Characters

BAE

BAE are a trio of friends who attend the same international private university. Their songs are upbeat and make use of Japanese, English, and Korean lyrics. The characters were designed by Akane Aki.

Allen is 21 years old and uses the rapper name SUZAKU. He is a quarter-Russian and comes from a family with a background in classical and opera music. His parents disapproved of his interest in hip hop to the point of burning his record collection when he was a teenager. He eventually left for university, continuing to follow his passion for hip hop.

Hajun is 21 years old and uses the rapper name 48 (pronounced yon-pachi). He speaks in a polite manner but can act cold and even cruel. Hajun is South Korean and the illegitimate son of the Yeon family, who owns a large conglomerate. After his parents conceived a legitimate son who could become the heir, he was deemed unnecessary to the family and sent to Japan. Hajun has held a grudge against them since and seeks to take down the conglomerate.

Anne is 20 years old and uses the rapper name AnZ. They are an otokonoko and look feminine because of their fashionable appearance. They are half-British and half-Japanese. Anne has an estranged relationship with their mother who suppressed their self-expression to make them the perfect child in her eyes. As such, they heavily value being able to live true to themselves now.

The Cat's Whiskers

The Cat's Whiskers is a four-person team whose songs combine elements of hip hop and jazz. The members all work at Bar 4/7, owned by the team's leader Naoakira. The characters of The Cat's Whiskers were designed by Kuniharu Komiya.

Naoakira is 34 years old and uses the rapper name . He is a university linguistics professor and owner of Bar 4/7. He has a caring personality which led him to taking in Ryu and Shiki. He was once a member of the successful hip hop group Quadra X (stylized as XXXX) with Yohei and his late wife Tsubaki.

Yohei is 28 years old and uses the rapper name God Summer. He used to be a gang member affiliated with the Suiseki clan and now works as a bartender at Bar 4/7. He has known Naoakira and his late wife for many years, and he looks after Ryu and Shiki with him.

Ryu claims to be 800 years old and uses the rapper name . He is an eccentric individual who works as a bartender-in-training, though the drinks he mixes are bizarre and unpalatable. Oddly, he does not suffer from the phantometal's side effects of traumatic illusions.

Shiki is 17 years old and uses the rapper name . He is a high schooler and works as bar hall staff at Bar 4/7. Shiki is kind and musically talented, yet timid and insecure. He looks up to Naoakira and Yohei and is good friends with Ryu despite his eccentric behavior.

Cozmez

Cozmez (stylized in all lowercase) is a duo consisting of the Yatonokami twins Kanata and Nayuta. Their songs are mainly trap music, with their lyrics often revolving around the hardships of their childhood and living in the slums. In 2021, Cozmez was declared the winning team of the original Paradox Live competition. The characters were designed by Kinako.

Kanata is 19 years old and uses the rapper name Kanata (in romaji). He is the older twin and is extremely protective of Nayuta. Because he grew up around abusive adults, he is distrustful and hardly cares for anyone besides Nayuta. Along with rapping, he made money by taking up shady jobs from Iori.

Nayuta is 19 years old and uses the rapper name Nayuta (in romaji). He is the younger twin and has relied on Kanata since childhood because of his weak constitution. It is revealed that in the past, Nayuta partook in phantometal experiments for money, which caused him to develop a condition called metal erosion that affected his health. Feeling he would burden Kanata with his condition, he attempted suicide by jumping off of a building. Nayuta survived but fell into a coma. He was taken in by Alter Trigger, the organization who experimented on him, and the Nayuta shown in the series prior is revealed to be a phantom that Kanata created subconsciously. By the time Cozmez wins Paradox Live, the real Nayuta has woken up from his coma and reunites with Kanata and Shiki, who he had befriended before the incident.

Akanyatsura

 is a five-person group whose members are associated with the Suiseki clan, a yakuza group. They consider each other family. Their songs are mainly dance-floor related, using elements of street urban and/or international instrumentals. The characters were designed by Harada.

Iori is 28 years old and uses the rapper name . He owns a hostess club called CLUB CANDY. After an incident where many members of the Suiseki clan, including the previous leader, were killed, Iori vows to find the people behind the attack and avenge the deceased members. He cares greatly for his team, with the younger members viewing him as a big brother figure, and he keeps a cheerful persona to hide his more calculating side.

Zen is 27 years old and uses the rapper name . He was formerly a police officer and now works at CLUB CANDY. He acts as Iori's right-hand man and cares for the younger members of Akanyatsura with him. He is passionate about exercise and is easily moved to tears.

Hokusai is 24 years old and uses the rapper name . He appears tall, mysterious, and stoic, but he is actually a gentle and kind-hearted young man who loves animals, especially cats. Because his father was arrested for murder when Hokusai was young, he had a lonely and tumultuous childhood where he was bullied and eventually became homeless. He was taken in by Iori when he was 18 and has lived with Akanyatsura since. He attends high school as a part-time student in the evening.

Satsuki is 19 years old and uses the rapper name . He is hot-headed and gullible, but extremely loyal to the people he cares for. When he was younger, he had trouble with studying and often fought with other children, being deemed an uncontrollable problem child by his parents and teachers. He was sent to juvenile reform after an incident where he was betrayed by an old friend, and was discharged later on only to find his family had abandoned him. Satsuki was taken in by the Suiseki clan when he was 16 and has lived with them since. He attends high school as a part-time student in the evening. He also has a crush on Anne, unaware that they are not a woman.

Reo is 17 years old and uses the rapper name . As the youngest member, he enjoys being spoiled and often uses his cute appearance to his advantage. He originally belonged to a rich family, though his father lived a debaucherous life and disappeared one day, leaving behind a massive debt. At 14, he was saved by Iori and joined the Suiseki clan to erase his debt. He has lived with them since. He attends high school as a part-time student in the evening.

Buraikan

 is a legendary hip hop duo that had gone mysteriously underground for about a decade before the beginning of the main story. Their songs are mainly throwback music, stemming from the late 90s/early 00s. The characters were designed by Suoh.

Chisei uses the rapper name . He is able to create powerful phantoms despite having no trauma. 

Haruomi is 36 years old and uses the rapper name . He is the group's trackmaker. He also owns Raimentei, a ramen shop that many of the characters frequent.

VISTY 
VISTY is a four-member idol group struggling with their falling popularity due to their center member leaving. Their songs have a modern K-pop style, much like BTS, mixed with hip-hop. The characters were designed by Kazari Tayu. 

Shogo is 20 years old and uses the rapper name SHOGO. He is the leader of VISTY and struggles with being in the shadow of his father, a famous actor. He likes sweets and enjoys trying new flavors of gummies.

Toma is 21 years old and uses the rapper name TOMA. Along with being a member of VISTY, he is a university student and model. He enjoys cosmetics and has a passion for beauty.

Aoi is 16 years old and uses the rapper name AOI. Aoi has a mature nature, putting on a prince-like persona for VISTY's fans. They have a strong admiration towards Anne.

Kantaro is 17 years old and uses the rapper name KANTARO. He is the group's trackmaker and has a lively persona. He is dependent on validation from social media and egosurfs often.

AMPRULE 
AMPRULE is a master-servant duo consisting of Hajun's half-brother, Dongha, who desires to destroy him in the upcoming competition, and Chunsung, the Yeon family butler who pledges absolute allegiance to Dongha. Their songs have a high-class atmosphere, but with negative lyrics. The characters were designed by Uri. 

Dongha is 14 years old and uses the rapper name lil EMPERA. He is Hajun's younger half-brother and the legitimate heir of the Yeon conglomerate. He seeks to crush Hajun in the competition. Dongha is highly disciplined and has an arrogant attitude, but he struggles with an inferiority complex and vies for his father's attention.

Chungsung is 28 years old and uses the rapper name BATTLER. He is the family butler to the Yeon family and is heavily devoted to Dongha. He is a masochist and enjoys being punished.

1Nm8 
1Nm8 (pronounced inmate) is a three-member unit who all live under the same roof together. Their songs consist of pure, synth-pop. The characters were designed by Hou. 

Kei is 19 years old and uses the rapper name 7. He formerly held the center role of VISTY, but left the group. His goal is to put an end to the phantom lives.

Itsuki is 17 years old and uses the rapper name 5. He was formerly a subject of human experimentation, giving him an ability called "Shutter Eye", which appears to give him photographic memory. He is reserved with his emotions.

Rokuta is 17 years old and uses the rapper name 6. He was formerly a subject of human experimentation. As a result, he has gained the ability of super strength and has no memories before being a test subject. He is energetic, friendly, and loves eating karaage.

Goku Luck 
Goku Luck (獄Luck) is a four-member group consisting of a prison guard and three prisoners. They specialize in rap-rock. The characters were designed by Lack. 

Yuto is 32 years old and uses the rapper name HANCHO. He is an ex-mercenary and currently works as a prison guard. He may have a courteous, unreliable persona on the surface, but he has an alternate, more aggressive personality that comes out on stage and when provoked. However, he doesn't know what the alternative personality does behind the main personality's back, leaving him worried.

Ryoga is 23 years old and uses the rapper name PITBULL. He was formerly a gang member and is now in prison. He has trouble communicating and is shown to have a stutter.

Shion is 22 years old and uses the rapper name smokin'dog. He is a prisoner and flirtatious hedonist who enjoys smoking and drinking. 

Kenta is 15 years old and uses the rapper name anonymous. He is a hacker and prisoner. He is sharp-tongued and enjoys provoking others.

Discography

Singles

Albums

Video Albums

Other charted songs

Anime

At the end of the Paradox Live 2nd dope show live concert, it was announced that the project will be receive an anime television series adaptation titled Paradox Live the Animation. It is produced by Pine Jam and directed by Naoya Ando, with scripts written by Takayo Ikami, and character designs handled by Koji Haneda. The series will premiere in 2023.

Notes

References

External links
 

2019 establishments in Japan
2023 anime television series debuts
Animated musical groups
Avex Group artists
Japanese boy bands

Japanese musical groups
Japanese rappers
Musical groups established in 2019
Pine Jam
Upcoming anime television series